is a JR West Geibi and Fukuen Line station located in Minami Hatajiki-machi, Miyoshi, Hiroshima Prefecture, Japan. The name of the station came from the opposite shore of the Basen River.

History
1922-06-07: Yatsugi Station opens 
1987-04-01: Japan National Railways is privatized, and Yatsugi Station becomes a JR West station

Station building and platform
Yatsugi Station features one platform and one line. The station building is compact.  Tickets can be purchased at the store in front of Yatsugi Station.

Environs
Yatsugi Post Office
Minami Hatajiki Branch Post Office
Miyoshi Municipal Yatsugi Elementary
Hiroshima Prefectural Miyoshi High School
Mazda Automobile Laboratory
Basen River

Highway access
Chūgoku Expressway Miyoshi Interchange
Japan National Route 183
Japan National Route 184
Hiroshima Prefectural Route 434 (Wachi Miyoshi Route)

Connecting lines
All lines are JR West lines. 
Geibi Line
Kamisugi Station — Yatsugi Station — Miyoshi Station
Fukuen Line
Kamisugi Station — Yatsugi Station — Miyoshi Station

External links
 JR West

Railway stations in Hiroshima Prefecture
Fukuen Line
Geibi Line
Railway stations in Japan opened in 1922